Alexsandro "Alex" Ferreira (born January 10, 1986), sometimes known as just Alex, is a Brazilian right back  for Paraná in the Brazilian Série A.

Contract
1 April 2007 to 1 April 2010

External links 

1986 births
Living people
Brazilian footballers
Paraná Clube players
Association football defenders
Footballers from Curitiba